This is a list of Irish Academy Award winners and nominees. It includes people from the Republic of Ireland and from Northern Ireland. It does not include members of the Irish diaspora unless they were born in Ireland or hold Irish citizenship.

Best Picture

Best Director

Best Actor

Best Actress

Best Supporting Actor

Best Supporting Actress

Best Original Screenplay

Best Adapted Screenplay

Best Animated Feature

Best International Feature Film

Best Documentary Short

Best Live Action Short

Best Animated Short

Best Original Song

Best Sound

Best Production Design

Best Cinematography

Best Film Editing

Best Makeup and Hairstyling

Best Costume Design

Best Visual Effects

Nominations and Winners

See also
 Cinema of Ireland
 List of Irish actors
 List of Irish films
 Irish Film & Television Awards

References

Lists of Academy Award winners and nominees by nationality or region
Academy Award winners and nominees
Academy Award winners and nominees